Tonkawa is a city in Kay County, Oklahoma, United States, along the Salt Fork Arkansas River. The population was 3,216 at the 2010 census, a decline of 2.5 percent from the figure of 3,299 in 2000.

History
Named after the Tonkawa tribe, the city of Tonkawa was founded in March 1894, by Eli V. Blake and Wiley William Gregory. Blake and Gregory, originally from Kansas, claimed the land that would become Tonkawa in the Land Run of 1893. Prior to the land run, from 1879 to 1885, the area was known as "Fort Oakland", home to the Nez Perce people. In 1885, the remnants of the Tonkawa tribe, who had fled Indian Territory after the 1862 Tonkawa Massacre, returned to settle in the Fort Oakland area. The Blackwell and Southern Railway (later bought by the Atchison, Topeka and Santa Fe Railway) built a line through Tonkawa, which stimulated growth of the town. In 1901, the Oklahoma Territory Legislature established the University Preparatory School (now Northern Oklahoma College) here. By statehood, the population was 1,238. The discovery of oil caused a boom in the 1920s, and the population was 3,311 in 1930.

Camp Tonkawa
During World War II, Tonkawa was home to Camp Tonkawa, a prisoner-of-war camp. Camp Tonkawa remained in operation from August 30, 1943, to September 1, 1945. Built between October and December 1942, the  site contained more than 180 wooden structures for 3,000 German POWs as well as 500 U.S. Army guard troops, service personnel and civilian employees. The first prisoners, consisting of German troops from the Afrika Korps, arrived in August 1943. During their internment, prisoners labored at local farms and ranches. In November 1943, a prison riot caused the death of a German soldier, Johannes Kunze. Eight prisoners briefly escaped, only to be recaptured.

Geography
Tonkawa is located in southwestern Kay County at  (36.680362, -97.309219). U.S. Route 60 passes through the northern side of the city, leading east to Ponca City and west  to Lamont. U.S. Route 77 follows US 60 east to Ponca City, but turns south in Tonkawa and becomes Main Street, then leads south  to Perry. I-35 leads south  to Oklahoma City and north  to Wichita, Kansas.

Demographics

As of the census of 2000, there were 3,299 people, 1,197 households, and 801 families residing in the city. The population density was 591.3 people per square mile (228.3/km). There were 1,417 housing units at an average density of 254.0 per square mile (98.0/km). The racial makeup of the city was 86.39% White, 0.85% African American, 5.55% Native American, 0.33% Asian, 3.06% from other races, and 3.82% from two or more races. Hispanic or Latino of any race were 6.64% of the population.

There were 1,197 households, out of which 32.0% had children under the age of 18 living with them, 53.8% were married couples living together, 8.9% had a female householder with no husband present, and 33.0% were non-families. 29.1% of all households were made up of individuals, and 13.4% had someone living alone who was 65 years of age or older. The average household size was 2.47 and the average family size was 3.06.

In the city, the population was spread out, with 24.9% under the age of 18, 17.3% from 18 to 24, 23.6% from 25 to 44, 19.0% from 45 to 64, and 15.3% who were 65 years of age or older. The median age was 33 years. For every 100 females, there were 98.1 males. For every 100 females age 18 and over, there were 95.2 males.

The median income for a household in the city was $29,387, and the median income for a family was $35,912. Males had a median income of $27,222 versus $20,128 for females. The per capita income for the city was $14,245. About 12.5% of families and 17.6% of the population were below the poverty line, including 23.9% of those under age 18 and 9.0% of those age 65 or over.

Education
Tonkawa is covered by the Tonkawa Public Schools district which includes Tonkawa Elementary, Tonkawa Middle School, and Tonkawa High School. Tonkawa is also home to Northern Oklahoma College which provides Associates level education.

Points of interest

Museums
 North Oklahoma Botanical Garden and Arboretum
 A. D. Buck Museum of Science and History
 Tonkawa Historical Museum (McCarter Museum)
 Tonkawa Tribal Museum
 Eleanor Hays Art Gallery (at Northern Oklahoma College)
 Pickens Learning Commons

NRHP sites
The following sites in Tonkawa are listed on the National Register of Historic Places:
 First Presbyterian Church of Tonkawa

Notable people
 Henry Bellmon, first Republican governor of Oklahoma (1963–1967, 1991–1995) and U.S. senator (1969–1981) from Billings, OK
 Bo Bowling, Montreal Alouettes player

See also
 Tonkawa massacre

References

External links

 Official website

Cities in Kay County, Oklahoma
Cities in Oklahoma
1894 establishments in Oklahoma Territory